Russell Carrington Wilson (born November 29, 1988) is an American football quarterback for the Denver Broncos of the National Football League (NFL). He previously played his first 10 seasons for the Seattle Seahawks. Wilson has been regarded as one of the greatest dual-threat quarterbacks of all time.

Wilson played college football and baseball at NC State from 2008 to 2010 before transferring to Wisconsin in 2011, where he set the single-season FBS record for passer rating and led them to a Big Ten title and the 2012 Rose Bowl. He also played minor league baseball for the Tri-City Dust Devils in 2010 and the Asheville Tourists in 2011 as a second baseman.

The Seahawks selected Wilson in the third round (75th overall) of the 2012 NFL Draft. He tied Peyton Manning's then-record for most passing touchdowns by a rookie and was named Pepsi NFL Rookie of the Year. Wilson has been named to nine Pro Bowls and helped lead the Seahawks to two consecutive Super Bowls. Though he and the Seahawks won Super Bowl XLVIII, Wilson was intercepted at the goal line by Malcolm Butler, and lost Super Bowl XLIX. He holds the record for most wins by an NFL quarterback through nine seasons and is one of five quarterbacks in NFL history with a career passer rating over 100. In April 2019, Wilson signed a four-year, $140 million contract extension with the Seahawks, making him the highest paid player in the NFL at the time. In 2020, he became just the third quarterback in NFL history to throw for thirty touchdowns in four consecutive seasons.

Wilson is part owner of the Seattle Sounders FC of Major League Soccer (MLS). After he purchased his minority stake, the Sounders won the 2019 MLS Cup.

Early life and background
Wilson was born at The Christ Hospital in Cincinnati, and grew up in Richmond, Virginia. His parents are Harrison Benjamin Wilson III, a lawyer, and Tammy Wilson (née Turner), a nurse director. He has an older brother, Harrison IV, and a younger sister, Anna. Wilson started playing football with his father and brother at the age of four, and played his first organized game for the Tuckahoe Tomahawks youth football team in sixth grade.

Wilson's great-great-grandfather was a slave to a Confederate colonel and was freed after the American Civil War. Wilson's paternal grandfather, Harrison B. Wilson Jr., was a former president of Norfolk State University who played football and basketball at Kentucky State University, and his paternal grandmother, Anna W. Wilson, was on the faculty at Jackson State University. Wilson's maternal grandfather was noted painter A. B. Jackson. According to genetic admixture analysis, Wilson is 62% African, 36% European, 1% West Asian, and 1% Central Asian. His European family lineage has been traced back to 524 A.D. to Saint Arnulf of Metz via Charlemagne. Wilson also claims to have some Native American ancestry, although he did not explicitly say which tribe he came from.

Wilson's father played football and baseball at Dartmouth and was a wide receiver for the San Diego Chargers preseason squad in 1980. Wilson's brother, Harry, played football and baseball at the University of Richmond, and his sister Anna played basketball at Stanford.

Wilson's father died of complications from diabetes on June 9, 2010, at age 55, the day after Wilson was drafted by the Rockies.

High school career
Wilson attended Collegiate School, a preparatory school in Richmond, Virginia. As a junior in 2005, he threw for 3,287 passing yards and 40 passing touchdowns and rushed for 634 rushing yards and 15 rushing touchdowns. He was named an all-district, all-region, and all-state player. Wilson was twice named the Richmond Times-Dispatch Player of the Year.

As a senior, he threw for 3,009 passing yards, 34 passing touchdowns, and seven interceptions. In addition, he rushed for 1,132 yards and 18 touchdowns. That year, he was named an all-conference and all-state player as well as conference player of the year. He was featured in Sports Illustrated for his performance in the state championship game win. Wilson also served as his senior class president.

During his time in high school, Wilson attended the Manning Passing Academy, a summer football clinic run by multiple NFL MVP winner and eventual Hall of Fame quarterback Peyton Manning. Due to this encounter, Manning recognized Wilson many years later when the latter had flown to Denver to discuss the prospect of getting drafted by the Denver Broncos, where Manning had recently signed.

Wilson was also a member of the Collegiate School basketball and baseball teams.

Wilson committed to North Carolina State University on July 23, 2006. He also received a football scholarship offer from Duke University.

College football career

NC State

Wilson redshirted during the 2007 season at NC State. In 2008, Wilson initially split time at quarterback with senior Daniel Evans and junior Harrison Beck. However, Evans and Beck saw no regular season action after Week 2 and Week 5, respectively. Thereafter, Wilson led the team to a 4–3 record in the regular season which NC State finished out on a four-game winning streak. During a 30–24 win over East Carolina, Wilson threw for 201 yards and three touchdowns. He threw for two touchdowns in each of the last six games in the regular season.

In the 2008 PapaJohns.com Bowl against Rutgers, Wilson threw for 186 yards and a touchdown and rushed for 46 yards before halftime. Late in the first half, he scrambled to the Rutgers' four-yard line, where he was tackled and suffered a knee sprain. With Wilson sitting out the remainder of the game, his replacements threw a combined total of three interceptions with NC State, eventually losing 29–23. Over the course of the season, he completed 150 of 275 attempts for 1,955 yards and 17 touchdowns with just one interception. He also recorded 116 carries for 394 yards and four touchdowns. The Atlantic Coast Conference (ACC) named him the first-team All-ACC quarterback. It was the first time in conference history that a freshman quarterback was named to the first team.

Prior to the 2009 season, Wilson was named quarterback of the pre-season all-ACC football team on July 12. On September 19, Wilson broke Andre Woodson's all-time NCAA record of 325 consecutive pass attempts without an interception against Gardner–Webb. The 379-pass streak ended in a game against Wake Forest on October 3. Wilson held the record until November 10, 2012, when it was broken by Louisiana Tech quarterback Colby Cameron. Wilson was named honorable mention All-ACC in 2009. Wilson finished the 2009 regular season with 3,027 passing yards, 31 touchdowns, and 11 interceptions as the team finished with a 5–7 record.

Wilson led the 2010 Wolfpack to a 9–4 season that included a 23–7 win over West Virginia in the 2010 Champs Sports Bowl. He led the ACC in passing yards per game (274.1) and total offensive yards per game (307.5). He was named second-team All-ACC and runner-up for ACC Football Player of the Year. In May 2010, Wilson graduated from NC State in three years with a BA in communication, and took graduate-level business courses in the fall semester during the 2010 football season.

Transfer
In January 2011, Wilson announced that he would report to spring training with the Colorado Rockies organization. NC State head coach Tom O'Brien expressed reservations with Wilson's decision, saying "Russell and I have had very open conversations about his responsibilities respective to baseball and football. While I am certainly respectful of Russell's dedication to baseball these last several years, within those discussions I also communicated to him the importance of his time commitment to NC State football."

O'Brien and his staff reached out to NFL coaches and general managers on Wilson's behalf, but he failed to receive an invitation to the 2011 NFL Scouting Combine.

On April 29, 2011, O'Brien announced that Wilson was granted a release from his football scholarship with one year of eligibility left.

Wisconsin

On June 27, 2011, Wisconsin head coach Bret Bielema said that Wilson committed to Wisconsin for the 2011 season. In the season opener against UNLV, Wilson passed for 255 yards and two touchdowns in a 51–17 victory. He also rushed for 62 yards, including a 46-yard touchdown run. In the next three games, Wilson threw for three passing touchdowns in each game, victories over Oregon State, Northern Illinois, and South Dakota. Following a 48–17 victory over previously undefeated #8 Nebraska, Wilson recorded a receiving touchdown in the 59–7 victory over Indiana. Wilson helped lead the Badgers to a 6–0 start and a #4 ranking in the AP Poll. The Badgers dropped their next two games, road losses to Michigan State and Ohio State. Wilson and the Badgers reeled off four consecutive wins to end the regular season. Wilson was efficient during the winning streak, passing for nine touchdowns to no interceptions while rushing for two touchdowns. At the end of the regular season, Wilson was named first team All-Big Ten by both the coaches and media. He also won the Griese-Brees Big Ten Quarterback of the Year award.

In the inaugural Big Ten Championship Game on December 3, Wilson threw for three touchdowns and led the Badgers to a 42–39 win over the Michigan State Spartans. Wilson was named the game's Grange-Griffin MVP. In December 2011, Wilson was named a third team All-American by Yahoo! Sports, and finished ninth in Heisman Trophy voting with 52 points.

In the 2012 Rose Bowl against the Oregon Ducks on January 2, 2012, Wilson had 19 pass completions on 25 attempts for 296 yards, 18 rushing yards, and three touchdowns (two passing, one rushing) as the Badgers lost by a score of 45–38. Wilson finished the season with 33 passing touchdowns, which set the single season record at Wisconsin and was the second-most in Big Ten history behind Drew Brees during the 1998 season at Purdue (39). Wilson also set the single season FBS record for passing efficiency (191.8). On January 28, 2012, Wilson completed his college football career at the 2012 Senior Bowl.

Statistics

Professional football career
On January 16, 2012, Wilson began training for the NFL Scouting Combine at the IMG Madden Football Academy in Bradenton, Florida. Prior to the 2012 NFL Draft, Wilson had been projected by NFL scouts and analysts to be a middle-round pick. In February 2012, former NFL quarterback and director of the IMG Madden Football Academy Chris Weinke said of Wilson, "If he was 6–5, he'd probably be the No. 1 pick in the draft." On April 11, 2012, ESPN Monday Night Football analyst Jon Gruden said, "The only issue with Russell Wilson is his height. That might be the reason he's not picked in the first couple rounds."

Seattle Seahawks
Wilson was selected by the Seattle Seahawks in the third round (75th overall) of the 2012 NFL Draft, the sixth quarterback selected. The Seahawks received significant criticism for their selections in the draft, and Wilson in particular, as they had just signed free agent Matt Flynn. Two weeks later, Wilson signed a four-year, $2.99 million contract with the Seahawks on May 7, 2012.

2012

Wilson made his preseason debut against the Tennessee Titans on August 11, 2012, and had his first preseason start on August 24 against the Kansas City Chiefs. Two days later on August 26, 2012, Wilson was named the starting quarterback for the first regular season game after competing with Matt Flynn and Tarvaris Jackson for the position.

On September 9, 2012, Wilson made his regular season debut in a 20–16 road loss to the Arizona Cardinals. He had 18 completions on 34 passing attempts for 153 yards, one passing touchdown, and one interception. In the third regular season game on Monday night, the Seahawks won 14–12 over the Green Bay Packers on a controversial Hail Mary touchdown pass to Golden Tate. The contentious nature of the replacement officials' decision on the play was widely considered to have been the tipping point that led to an agreement being reached to end the referee lockout.

Wilson earned the Rookie of the Week honors for his stellar performance in a 28–7 victory over the New York Jets on November 11; he completed 12 of 19 attempts for 188 yards and two touchdowns, and rushed for 34 yards on seven  attempts. He was named NFC Offensive Player of the Week and FedEx Player of the Week for his performance in the 23–17 road win over the Chicago Bears in overtime on December 2. In the 50–17 victory over the Buffalo Bills in Toronto on December 16, Wilson had 205 passing yards, one passing touchdown, nine rushes, 92 rushing yards, and a career-high three rushing touchdowns. He earned NFL Offensive Rookie of the Month honors for December 2012 after the Seahawks went 5–0 and he had a passer rating of 115.2.

Wilson finished the  regular season ranked fourth in the NFL in passer rating (100.0), beating the previous rookie record set by Ben Roethlisberger in 2004 (98.1), since broken by Robert Griffin III in 2012 (102.4) and Dak Prescott in  (104.9). He threw for 3,118 yards and 26 touchdowns, tying Peyton Manning's record for most touchdowns thrown by a rookie, and rushed for 489 yards and four touchdowns. Wilson's scrambling mobility and ability to extend plays outside the pocket with his legs earned numerous comparisons to Hall of Fame quarterback Fran Tarkenton.

Wilson led the Seahawks to the postseason in his rookie year, with both games on the road in January. He made his postseason debut in the NFC Wild Card Round against the Washington Redskins, passing for 187 yards and rushing for 67 yards as the Seahawks rallied for a 24–14 comeback victory. In the Divisional Round against the Atlanta Falcons, Wilson threw for 385 yards and rushed for 60 yards, and his team had a 28–27 lead with 31 seconds to go, but the Falcons managed to kick the winning field goal.

Wilson was selected as an alternate for the 2013 Pro Bowl, filling in for Matt Ryan of Atlanta. At the Pro Bowl in Hawaii on January 27, Wilson completed eight of ten attempts for 98 yards, three touchdowns, and no interceptions for a 147.1 rating.

At the end of the season, Wilson earned a bonus of $222,000 through the NFL's Performance-Based Pay program. He was ranked 51st by his fellow players on the NFL Top 100 Players of 2013.

2013: Super Bowl championship

The Seahawks began the 2013 season with the first 4–0 start in franchise history, before losing to the Indianapolis Colts in Week 5. The Seahawks then went on a 7-game winning streak, including a 41–20 victory over the Minnesota Vikings where he posted a career-high 151.4 passer rating and culminating in a 34–7 victory over the Saints in Week 13 in which Wilson threw three touchdown passes and earned his second NFC Offensive Player of the Week award. Over the next three weeks, the Seahawks suffered divisional losses to the San Francisco 49ers and Arizona Cardinals (the loss to the Cardinals was Wilson's first home loss), but defeated the Rams in Week 17 to finish the season with a 13–3 record, the NFC West title, and the No. 1 seed in the playoffs. Wilson finished the season with 26 touchdown passes, nine interceptions, and a 101.2 passer rating, becoming the first quarterback in the Super Bowl era to post a 100+ passer rating in each of his first two seasons. Wilson was named to his second Pro Bowl on December 27, 2013.

In the Divisional Round, the Seahawks defeated the New Orleans Saints by a score of 23–15. On January 19, 2014, Wilson and the Seahawks defeated the San Francisco 49ers in the NFC Championship by a score of 23–17, advancing to Super Bowl XLVIII. Wilson threw for 206 yards, two touchdowns, and no interceptions for a 123.1 passer rating in a 43–8 win over the Denver Broncos to give the Seahawks their first Super Bowl victory in franchise history. With the victory, Wilson became just the second black starting quarterback to win a Super Bowl, joining Super Bowl XXII winner Doug Williams. At 5'11", he also became the shortest quarterback to win a Super Bowl, shorter than Len Dawson, Joe Theismann, and Drew Brees (all 6'0").

Wilson earned a bonus of $169,141.73 for the 2013 season through the NFL's Performance-Based Pay program. He was ranked 20th by his fellow players on the NFL Top 100 Players of 2014.

2014: Back-to-back Super Bowl appearances

On September 21, 2014, Wilson led the Seahawks on an 80-yard touchdown drive in overtime to defeat the Denver Broncos, 26–20, in a Week 3 rematch of the previous season's Super Bowl. On October 6, 2014, against the Washington Redskins, Wilson set a new Monday Night Football record for rushing yards by a quarterback in a single game with 122. The Seahawks clinched a playoff spot in Week 16 when the Dallas Cowboys defeated the Indianapolis Colts by a score of  42–7, eliminating the Philadelphia Eagles from postseason contention and allowing the Seahawks to clinch their spot before their Sunday Night Football matchup. On December 21, 2014, Wilson went 20-of-31 and threw for a then-career-high 339 yards with two touchdown passes and a rushing touchdown against the Arizona Cardinals in a primetime matchup on Sunday Night Football. Wilson also led the offense in gaining 596 yards, setting a franchise record for most yards gained in a game. The Cardinals had the third-best scoring defense heading into Week 16. The Seahawks won 35–6 as they snapped the Cardinals' seven-game home winning streak and regained first place in the NFC West as well as the NFC's #1 seed. The Seahawks defeated the St. Louis Rams 20–6 in Week 17 to clinch the NFC West and the #1 seed for the second consecutive season, securing homefield advantage for the entirety of the NFC playoffs.

Wilson led the Seahawks to a 31–17 home win over the Carolina Panthers in the Divisional Round, making the Seahawks the first defending Super Bowl Champion to win a playoff game since the 2005 Patriots. The Seahawks hosted the Green Bay Packers in their second consecutive NFC Championship. Wilson threw three first-half interceptions while completing only two passes to his own team as the Seahawks fell behind 16–0 at halftime. With the Packers leading 19–7 and five minutes remaining in the fourth quarter, Wilson threw his fourth interception. Then Wilson led the Seahawks on an improbable comeback. On the Seahawks' next drive, Wilson ran the ball in for a touchdown to cut the deficit to 19–14. After a successful onside kick recovery, Wilson led the Seahawks down the field, and Lynch scored to give the Seahawks a 20–19 lead. Wilson completed a 15-yard, two-point conversion pass to Luke Willson to make it 22–19. The Packers tied it up with a field goal at the end of regulation and forced overtime. The Seahawks won the coin toss, and the offense took the field. Wilson led the Seahawks on an 80-yard drive that was capped by a 35-yard game-winning touchdown pass to Kearse. The Seahawks completed their largest postseason comeback in franchise history and clinched a Super Bowl berth.

Wilson would have been selected as an alternate to the Pro Bowl, but did not play because the Seahawks advanced to the Super Bowl; as Wilson did not have a chance to decline the invitation, the NFL recognizes this as a Pro Bowl berth for him.

Wilson became the first quarterback in NFL history to start two Super Bowls in his first three professional seasons. The Seahawks became the first defending champion to return to the Super Bowl since the 2004 Patriots. They faced the New England Patriots in Super Bowl XLIX, where they were defeated by a final score of 28–24. Although the Seahawks led 24–14 heading into the fourth quarter, the Patriots scored two consecutive touchdowns to take a four-point lead with 2:02 remaining. Wilson led the Seahawks to the Patriots' one-yard line with 25 seconds remaining, but Patriots cornerback Malcolm Butler intercepted a pass intended for Ricardo Lockette, sealing the victory for the Patriots. He was ranked 22nd by his fellow players on the NFL Top 100 Players of 2015.

2015

On July 31, 2015, the Seahawks and Wilson agreed to a 4-year, $87.6 million contract extension, making him, at the time, the second-highest-paid player in the NFL. In the first nine games of the season, Wilson threw 10 touchdown passes and seven interceptions. Over the next five games, Wilson threw 19 touchdowns and no interceptions, becoming the only quarterback in NFL history to throw 3+ touchdown passes and no interceptions in five consecutive games. After a 2–4 start to the season, Wilson led the Seahawks to win seven of their next eight games and clinch a fourth consecutive playoff appearance in their Week 15 win over the Cleveland Browns. His strong performance over the second half of the season, even after losing star running back Marshawn Lynch and tight end Jimmy Graham, led many analysts to consider Wilson an MVP candidate.

Wilson broke numerous Seahawks single season passing records in 2015, including most passing yards (4,024), most passing touchdowns (34), and highest passer rating (110.1). He became the first Seahawks quarterback to throw for over 4,000 yards in a season, and finished the year with the highest passer rating in the NFL. Wilson's 51.7% deep ball completion percentage was the highest among NFL quarterbacks. On December 22, 2015, Wilson was named to his third Pro Bowl. He was ranked 17th on the NFL Top 100 Players of 2016.

The Seahawks traveled to Minnesota to face the Minnesota Vikings in the Wild Card Round. The temperature at kickoff was −6°F (−25°F wind chill), making it the third coldest game in NFL history. Wilson struggled in the sub-zero temperatures, throwing for 142 yards, one touchdown, and one interception. The Vikings missed a short field goal in the last minute, allowing the Seahawks to advance to the Divisional Round to face the 15–1 Carolina Panthers. Down 31–0 at the half, Wilson helped lead a furious comeback attempt, but the Panthers won 31–24, denying Wilson and the Seahawks their third consecutive in the NFC Championship and a shot at a third consecutive Super Bowl appearance. In that game, Wilson threw for 366 yards, three touchdowns, and two interceptions.

Wilson was drafted first overall by Team Irvin in the 2016 Pro Bowl draft, and in the game threw eight completions on 12 attempts for 164 yards, three touchdowns, and no interceptions for a 149.3 rating. He was named the Pro Bowl offensive MVP.

2016

The Seahawks had a solid 2016 season with Wilson at the helm. However, Wilson drew two minor injuries: his ankle during Week 1 against the Miami Dolphins after getting stepped on by defensive lineman Ndamukong Suh, and his left knee against the San Francisco 49ers during Week 3 after a takedown by linebacker Eli Harold. The injuries hampered Wilson's trademark mobility, and many speculated that he would be rested in order to properly recover.

Regardless, Wilson started all 16 games in the season. On November 20, against the Philadelphia Eagles, he had a 15-yard touchdown reception on a pass from Doug Baldwin on a trick play. Wilson also played the worst game of his career in 2016, throwing 5 interceptions in a 38–10 loss to the Green Bay Packers during Week 14. The team finished with a 10–5–1 record and won the NFC West. Wilson put together a season where he recorded a career-high 4,219 passing yards, 21 passing touchdowns, 259 rushing yards, and one rushing touchdown. The Seahawks made the playoffs, where they defeated the Detroit Lions in the Wild Card Round. The win gave Wilson his eighth playoff victory. However, they fell to the eventual NFC champion Atlanta Falcons in the Divisional Round at the Georgia Dome. He was ranked 24th by his peers on the NFL Top 100 Players of 2017.

2017

On September 5, 2017, Wilson was voted Seahawks offensive captain for the fifth consecutive season. In Week 3, in a 33–27 loss to the Tennessee Titans, he was 29 of 49 for 373 passing yards and four passing touchdowns. In Week 8 against the Houston Texans, Wilson posted an astounding performance, going 26 of 41 for a career-high 452 passing yards and four touchdowns in a matchup where both he and Deshaun Watson each threw over 400 yards. Wilson also rushed for 30 yards, totaling 482 yards of offense in the 41–38 victory. With his strong performance, Wilson earned NFC Offensive Player of the Week. On December 21, 2017, the Seahawks were fined $100,000 for failure to properly apply the concussion protocol on a hit Wilson sustained during the Week 10 win over the Arizona Cardinals.

In Week 12, with the win over San Francisco, Wilson became the winningest quarterback in a player's first six seasons with 63 wins, surpassing Joe Flacco. Next week, with his 15-yard touchdown throw to running back J. D. McKissic, the third of his game, Wilson tied Eli Manning in 2011 for the most fourth quarter touchdowns in a single season with 15. He went 20 for 31 for 227 yards and three touchdowns in that game, earning him NFC Offensive Player of the Week. On December 19, 2017, Wilson was named to his fourth Pro Bowl.

The Seahawks ended the season with nine wins, ending Wilson's streak of five consecutive seasons with double-digit wins and a playoff appearance. He threw for 34 touchdown passes, finishing the season as the league's leader in touchdowns thrown. With 586 rushing yards and three touchdowns, he also finished the season as the team's leading rusher in both categories. Wilson was ranked 11th by his peers on the NFL Top 100 Players of 2018.

2018

With the Seahawks having lost many Pro Bowl starters in the offseason such as Cliff Avril, Michael Bennett, Kam Chancellor, Jimmy Graham, and Richard Sherman, and having star safety Earl Thomas injured in the beginning of the regular season, many considered the team a long shot to return to the playoffs. In addition to dealing with a re-tooled roster, Wilson also had a new offensive coordinator in Brian Schottenheimer, who replaced Darrell Bevell.

Wilson was once again named as a captain for the Seahawks going into the 2018 season. He started the season with 298 passing yards, three touchdowns, and two interceptions in a 27–24 loss to the Denver Broncos in Week 1. In Week 3, against the Dallas Cowboys, he helped lead the Seahawks to their first victory of the season with 192 passing yards and two touchdowns. In Weeks 5–8, against the Los Angeles Rams, Oakland Raiders, and Detroit Lions, he had three consecutive games with three passing touchdowns. In Week 13, against the San Francisco 49ers, he had 185 passing yards and four touchdowns in the 43–16 victory.

In Week 16, the Seahawks faced off against the top-seeded Kansas City Chiefs on NBC Sunday Night Football. Wilson out-dueled the season's eventual MVP Patrick Mahomes to lead the team to a 38–31 victory. This not only ensured another winning season for the Seahawks, but also defied early-season expectations by returning to the post-season after a one-year absence. Wilson finished the season with 35 touchdowns and a 110.9 passer rating, both personal and franchise bests. He also set career franchise records with most quarterback regular-season wins (75) and most touchdowns (196). As the No. 5-seed in the NFC, the Seahawks faced off against the Dallas Cowboys in the Wild Card Round. Wilson passed for 233 yards and one passing touchdown to go along with a rushing touchdown as the Seahawks fell 24–22.

Wilson was named to the Pro Bowl for the sixth time in his career, replacing Aaron Rodgers. He was ranked 25th by his fellow players on the NFL Top 100 Players of 2019.

2019

On April 16, 2019, Wilson signed a four-year, $140 million contract extension to remain with the Seahawks through the 2023 season, making him the highest paid player in the NFL. In Week 2 against the Pittsburgh Steelers, Wilson threw for 300 yards and three touchdowns as the Seahawks won 28–26, earning him NFC Offensive Player of the Week. In Week 3 against the New Orleans Saints, Wilson completed 32 passes for 406 yards and two passing touchdowns. In addition, he rushed seven times for 51 yards and two rushing touchdowns in the 33–27 loss. In Week 5 against the Los Angeles Rams, Wilson threw for 268 yards and four touchdowns in the 30–29 win on Thursday Night Football. The next week, in a 32–28 victory over the Cleveland Browns, he had 295 passing yards and two passing touchdowns. In Week 9 against the Tampa Bay Buccaneers, Wilson threw for 378 yards and five touchdowns in the 40–34 overtime win, taking over the league lead in touchdowns and quarterback rating. He was named NFC Offensive Player of the Week for his performance. In Week 10 against the then-undefeated San Francisco 49ers on Monday Night Football, Wilson threw for 232 yards, one touchdown, one interception and led the Seahawks to a 27–24 overtime win.

Wilson finished the 2019 season with 4,110 passing yards, 31 passing touchdowns, and five interceptions to go along with 75 carries for 342 rushing yards and three rushing touchdowns as the Seahawks finished with an 11–5 record and made the playoffs as the NFC's #5 seed. He was once again named to the Pro Bowl, but also made his first appearance on the AP All-Pro team, being named second-team quarterback after Lamar Jackson.

In the Wild Card Round against the Philadelphia Eagles, Wilson completed 18 of 30 passes for 325 yards and a touchdown. In addition, he rushed nine times for 45 yards. He accounted for 95 percent of the Seahawks total offense and led them to a 17–9 victory over the Eagles. In the Divisional Round against the Green Bay Packers, Wilson threw for 277 yards and a touchdown and rushed for 64 yards during the 28–23 loss.

Wilson was ranked 2nd on the NFL Top 100 Players of 2020, the highest of his career, and beat out the likes of renowned quarterbacks like Patrick Mahomes, Aaron Rodgers, and Tom Brady.

2020

Wilson started off the 2020 season going 31 of 35 for 322 passing yards and four passing touchdowns in the 38–25 victory over the Atlanta Falcons. He was named the NFC Offensive Player of the Week for his performance in Week 1. In Week 2, against the New England Patriots on NBC Sunday Night Football, he had 288 passing yards, five passing touchdowns, and one interception in the 35–30 victory. Wilson continued his great start to the season with 315 passing yards and five touchdowns in the 38–31 victory over the Dallas Cowboys. Wilson set an NFL record most passing touchdowns through three games with 14. He was again named the NFC Offensive Player of the Week for his performance in Week 3. On October 1, 2020, Wilson was named the NFC Offensive Player of the Month for his performance in September. In Week 4, Wilson passed for 360 yards, two touchdowns, and one interception in the 31–23 victory over the Miami Dolphins.

In Week 5 against the Minnesota Vikings on Sunday Night Football, Wilson threw for 217 yards and three touchdowns, including the game-winning six-yard touchdown pass to DK Metcalf with 14 seconds left in the game, during the 27–26 win. This win was his 100th win in 148 total games as starting quarterback for the Seahawks. In Week 7 against the Arizona Cardinals, Wilson completed 33 of 50 passes for 388 yards and three touchdowns, plus rushed 6 times for 48 yards, but threw three interceptions including a costly one to Isaiah Simmons with one minute left in overtime as the Seahawks lost 37–34. In Week 8 against the San Francisco 49ers, he threw for 261 yards and four passing touchdowns in the 37–27 victory. In Week 9, against the Buffalo Bills, he had 390 passing yards, two passing touchdowns, and two interceptions to go along with a rushing touchdown in the 44–34 loss, with the 44 points the Buffalo Bills scored becoming the highest number of points allowed in the Pete Carroll era. 

In Week 14 against the New York Jets, Wilson threw for 206 yards, four touchdowns, and one interception during the 40–3 win. In the Week 17 season finale against the San Francisco 49ers, Wilson threw for 20 of 36 for 181 yards and 2 touchdowns and also rushed for 29 yards in the 26–23 victory. Overall, Wilson finished the 2020 season with 4,212 passing yards, 40 touchdowns, and 13 interceptions. Wilson broke his own franchise record for passing touchdowns in a single season with his efforts in 2020. In the Wild Card Round, Wilson was unable to continue his success from the regular season, only completing 11 of 27 passes for 174 yards, two touchdowns, and one interception that was returned for a touchdown by Darious Williams in a 30–20 loss to the Los Angeles Rams. A few days later on February 6, Wilson was named Walter Payton NFL Man of the Year for his consistent and outgoing community service throughout the entirety of his career.

Wilson was ranked 12th on the NFL Top 100 Players of 2021, the third highest ranking of his career.

2021: Final year in Seattle

During the Week 5 loss to the Los Angeles Rams, Wilson left the game after suffering a broken finger in the third quarter. He had surgery to repair the injury on October 8, 2021. On October 15, 2021, he was ruled out for the Week 6 game against the Pittsburgh Steelers. It was the first game he missed in his career, which ended a streak of 149 consecutive games started by an NFL quarterback, which is sixth all-time. He was placed on injured reserved later that same day, ensuring he would miss the next three games at minimum. He was activated off injured reserve November 12. Wilson finished the season with 3,113 passing yards, 25 touchdowns, six interceptions, and an additional two rushing touchdowns as the Seahawks finished with a 7–10 record, their first losing record since Wilson’s arrival. Wilson earned his ninth Pro Bowl nomination after Tom Brady was unable to participate. He was ranked 61st by his fellow players on the NFL Top 100 Players of 2022.

Denver Broncos
On March 16, 2022, the Seahawks traded Wilson and a fourth-round pick to the Denver Broncos in exchange for two first-round picks, two second-round picks, a fifth-round pick, quarterback Drew Lock, defensive lineman Shelby Harris, and tight end Noah Fant.

Teammates said the trade was unavoidable, as Wilson broke with the team and "checked out" mid-season. Seahawks chairman Jody Allen released a statement indicating that the trade was initiated by Wilson. The Seahawks said that Wilson did not approve of the team firing offensive line coach Mike Solari and offensive coordinator Brian Schottenheimer. Wilson said that while he did not initiate the trade, the decision was mutual.

Before his departure, Wilson reportedly asked for the firing of coach Pete Carroll and general manager John Schneider, which Wilson denied.

On September 1, 2022, Wilson signed a five-year, $245 million contract extension with the Broncos.

2022
In the season opener of the 2022 season, against the Seahawks, Wilson completed 29 of 42 passes for 340 yards and one touchdown in a 17–16 loss to his former team.

In Week 2 against the Houston Texans, Wilson went 14 of 31 for 219 yards, one touchdown, and one interception in a 16–9 win, his first as a Bronco. Despite an 11–10 victory over the San Francisco 49ers in week 3, Wilson threw no touchdowns and only 126 yards. In Week 4 against the Las Vegas Raiders, Wilson completed 17 of 25 passes for 237 yards and two touchdowns, and also had 29 rushing yards and a rushing touchdown, but lost 32–23. Against the Indianapolis Colts, Wilson went 21 of 39 for 274 yards, no touchdowns, and two interceptions in a 12–9 overtime loss. After the game, Wilson underwent a procedure on his right shoulder.

In Week 6 against the Los Angeles Chargers, Wilson completed 10 passes for 116 yards and a touchdown for a 148.3 passer rating in the first quarter, but lost 19–16 in overtime. During the game, Wilson suffered a partially torn hamstring, causing him to miss Week 7 against the New York Jets. In Week 8 against the Jacksonville Jaguars in London, Wilson went 18 of 30 for 252 yards, one touchdown, and one interception in a 21–17 win.

In Week 10 against the Tennessee Titans, Wilson went 21 of 42 for 286 yards, one touchdown, and one interception in a 17–10 loss. In a Week 11 rematch against the Las Vegas Raiders, Wilson went 24 of 31 for 247 yards, no touchdowns, and no interceptions in a 22–16 overtime loss. Against the Carolina Panthers in week 12, Wilson went 19 of 35 for 142 yards and a touchdown in a 23–10 loss. 

In Week 13 against the Baltimore Ravens, Wilson went 17 of 22 for 189 yards, no touchdowns, and no interceptions in a 10–9 loss. In Week 14 against the Kansas City Chiefs, Wilson went 23 of 36 for 247 yards, three touchdowns, and an interception in a 34–28 loss, but left the game after sustaining a concussion during the fourth quarter. Despite passing concussion protocols, Wilson missed the Week 15 game against the Arizona Cardinals.

Wilson returned in Week 16 against the Los Angeles Rams, where he threw for 214 yards, a touchdown, and three interceptions, and was sacked six times in the 51–14 loss. In a Week 17 rematch against the Kansas City Chiefs, Wilson went 26 of 38 for 222 yards, a touchdown, and an interception, along with 27 rushing yards and two rushing touchdowns in a 27–24 loss. In a Week 18 rematch against the Los Angeles Chargers, Wilson went 13 of 24 for 283 yards, three touchdowns, and an interception in a 31–28 win.

Overall, Wilson passed for 3,524 yards, 16 touchdowns, and 11 interceptions along with 55 carries for 277 rushing yards and three rushing touchdowns in the 2022 season. The 2022 season was considered a massive disappointment for Wilson and the Broncos and resulted in the firing of head coach Nathaniel Hackett. Wilson was sacked more than any other quarterback in the 2022 season. The Broncos had the league's worst scoring offense with 287 total points for 16.9 points per game. Despite the disappointing season for Wilson, some of his teammates went on social media to express their support for him.

NFL career statistics

Regular season

Postseason

NFL records
 Most passing yards in a playoff game by a rookie: 385
 Most fourth quarter touchdown passes in a season: 16 (2017)

Seattle Seahawks records 
 Highest passer rating, career (minimum 500 attempts): 101.8
 Highest passer rating, season (minimum 200 attempts): 110.9, 2018
 Highest passer rating, rookie season (minimum 200 attempts): 100.0
 Highest completion percentage, rookie season (minimum 200 attempts): 64.1
 Lowest percentage passes intercepted, career (minimum 500 attempts): 1.80
 Lowest percentage passes intercepted, rookie season (minimum 200 attempts): 2.54
 Most rushing yards by a quarterback, career: 4,689
 Most rushing yards by a quarterback, season: 849, 2014
 Most rushing yards by a quarterback, rookie season: 489
 Highest yard rushing average, career (minimum 400 attempts): 5.5
 Highest yard rushing average, season (minimum 100 attempts): 7.2
 Most passing yards, career: 37,059
 Most passing yards, rookie season: 3,118
 Most passing yards, game: 452 on October 29, 2017, against the Houston Texans
 Most passing touchdowns, career: 292
 Most passing touchdowns, season: 40, 2020
 Most passing touchdowns, rookie season: 26
 Most passing touchdowns, game (tied with three players): 5
 Most games with a passing TD, career: 137

Awards and honors

NFL
 Super Bowl XLVIII Champion
 2x NFC Champion (2013, 2014)
 9× Pro Bowl (2012–2015, 2017–2021)
 Second-team All-Pro (2019)
 NFC Offensive Player of the Month (September 2020)
 NFL Offensive Rookie of the Month (December 2012)
 11× NFC Offensive Player of the Week
 Pepsi NFL Rookie of the Week (Week 10, 2012)
 PFWA Good Guy Award (2014)
 7× FedEx Air Player of the Week
 3x Steve Largent Award (2012, 2018, 2019)
 NFL Top 100: 51st (2013), 20th (2014), 22nd (2015), 17th (2016), 24th (2017), 11th (2018), 25th (2019), 2nd (2020), 12th (2021)
 Walter Payton Man of The Year (2020)
 Bart Starr Award (2022)

MLS
 2019 MLS Cup Champion (as part owner of the Seattle Sounders FC)

Baseball career
After graduating from high school, Wilson was selected by the Baltimore Orioles as the fifth pick in the 41st round (1,222nd overall) of the 2007 MLB draft. The Orioles considered Wilson a talent worthy of the first ten rounds and offered him a $350,000 signing bonus, the third-largest they offered a draftee that year after Matt Wieters ($6 million) and Jake Arrieta ($1.1 million). Wilson instead chose to attend NC State that fall. In a 2008 interview, Wilson said, "I was leaning towards [entering the draft], but a college education is something you'll always have."

College baseball
Wilson was a member of the NC State Wolfpack baseball team from 2008 to 2010, and in the summer of 2009 played for the Gastonia Grizzlies, a collegiate summer baseball team in the Coastal Plain League. He hit .282/.384/.415 with five home runs and 30 runs batted in (RBIs) during his collegiate career.

Professional baseball

On June 8, 2010, Wilson was drafted by the Colorado Rockies in the fourth round (140th pick overall) of the 2010 MLB draft. That summer he played 32 games as a second baseman for the Tri-City Dust Devils, the Class A Short Season affiliate of the Rockies in the Northwest League. He finished the season with two home runs, 11 RBIs, and a .230 batting average.

In the summer of 2011, Wilson played 61 games for the Asheville Tourists, the Class A affiliate of the Colorado Rockies in the South Atlantic League. He hit three home runs with 15 RBIs and a .228 batting average. In January 2012, Wilson informed the Rockies that he would be pursuing a career in the NFL and would not report to spring training for the 2012 season.

On December 12, 2013, Wilson was acquired from the Rockies by the Texas Rangers in the Triple-A phase of the Rule 5 draft. Wilson attended Rangers spring training in Surprise, Arizona in 2014 and 2015.

On February 7, 2018, Wilson was traded from the Rangers to the New York Yankees and assigned to the Yankees' Double-A affiliate, the Trenton Thunder. Wilson grew up as a Yankees fan and promised his late father that he would one day wear the Yankees uniform. On March 2, Wilson pinch-hit for Aaron Judge in the fifth inning against the Atlanta Braves, his first appearance in a professional baseball game since 2011. He struck out on five pitches from Braves pitcher Max Fried.

Business ventures and endorsements
On April 26, 2012, Wilson announced he had chosen French/West/Vaughan as his marketing, public relations, and endorsements agency. Since being named the starting quarterback of the Seahawks in August 2012, Wilson has appeared in advertisements for Levi's, American Family Insurance, Pepsi, Nike, Alaska Airlines, Microsoft, Duracell, Braun, Bose, United Way, and Larson Automotive Group.

In 2014, Wilson became part-owner and endorser of Eat the Ball, a European bread company. In 2015, he began endorsing Luvo, a frozen food company, and Reliant Recovery Water. On February 29, 2016, Wilson launched Good Man Brand, a clothing line which he co-founded. In August 2016, it was announced that Wilson had partnered with Juice Press to open the company's first Seattle franchise.

On November 14, 2016, Wilson announced he had joined Chris Hansen, Wally Walker, and Erik and Pete Nordstrom as partners in the investment group working to bring a new sports arena to Seattle's SoDo neighborhood for potential NBA and NHL teams.

In 2017, Wilson founded a fan network platform to connect fans with celebrities called TraceMe. TraceMe launched its public beta on September 8, 2017, and announced $9 million in Series A funding with investors including Jeff Bezos' Bezos Expeditions, Alibaba co-founder Joe Tsai, and YouTube co-founder Chad Hurley.

On November 20, 2017, football helmet manufacturer VICIS announced a $7 million investment round which included Wilson as an investor.

In June 2018, Wilson and his wife Ciara announced they were joining an effort to bring a Major League Baseball franchise to Portland, Oregon. In July 2018, Wilson became an investor and endorser for Molecule, a mattress company.

In September 2018, Wilson was announced as the next athlete to appear on the cover of the Wheaties cereal box.

In August 2019, Wilson and Ciara announced that they had joined the ownership group of Seattle Sounders FC, the local Major League Soccer club. The Sounders went on to win the 2019 MLS Cup, giving Wilson an MLS Cup to his credit as part owner.

In January 2020, Wilson was named Chairman of NFL FLAG. The global partnership will focus on strengthening NFL FLAG domestically and expanding the league internationally. He has worked with the flag football organizations in China, Brazil, Canada, and the United Kingdom to help spread awareness of the sport and get athletes engaged in the game at a young age. More recently, both Wilson and Ciara struck first look deal with Amazon Studios.

In popular culture
Wilson has appeared on the cover of several magazines including Sports Illustrated, Sports Illustrated Kids, Rolling Stone, ESPN The Magazine, Men's Fitness, and Men's Health.

Rapper Eminem mentions Wilson in his 2013 song, "The Monster":

Wilson has appeared on Late Show with David Letterman, Jimmy Kimmel Live!, Late Night with Seth Meyers, Charlie Rose, and in the 2015 film Entourage. He also hosted the 2015, 2016, and 2017 Kids' Choice Sports on Nickelodeon.

Wilson was the keynote speaker for the commencement address at both of his alma maters in 2016 at the University of Wisconsin–Madison and in 2021 at North Carolina State University.

Personal and academic life
Wilson graduated from NC State with a bachelor's degree in communications in 2010 after three years of study. After transferring to the University of Wisconsin, he got a master's degree in educational leadership and policy analysis.

Wilson met his first wife, Ashton Meem, while they were both high school students. They married in January 2012 and divorced in April 2014.

Wilson is married to American R&B singer Ciara. They began dating in early 2015 and announced their engagement on March 11, 2016. They were married on July 6, 2016, at Peckforton Castle in Cheshire, England. He has a stepson from her relationship with Future. Their daughter was born on April 28, 2017. On January 30, 2020, they announced that they were expecting their second child together. Their son was born on July 23, 2020. In 2022, the couple purchased a home in Cherry Hills Village, Colorado for $25 million, setting the record for the most expensive home purchase in the Denver metropolitan area.

While Wilson was playing for the Seahawks, he and Ciara lived in the Seattle suburb of Bellevue, Washington until selling their home in April 2022 for $36 million. Wilson also has a house in San Diego.

Wilson is a devout Christian. He frequently speaks about his Christian faith on his social media accounts. Wilson and Ciara made a vow to be celibate until they got married.

His net worth as of October 2016 is $120 million.

Wilson's younger sister Anna played basketball at Stanford.

In September 2021, Wilson and Ciara announced that they were writing a children's book called Why Not You? to help kids pursue their dreams. The book was released on March 1, 2022.

Charitable work
Wilson was an active volunteer in the Seattle community. During the NFL season, Wilson made weekly visits on his days off to the Seattle Children's Hospital, and also visited soldiers at Joint Base Lewis-McChord. In the offseason, Wilson hosts the Russell Wilson Passing Academy, a youth football camp, in several cities. In 2012, proceeds from the camp went to the Charles Ray III Diabetes Association, for which Wilson is the National Ambassador. In 2013 and 2014, Wilson partnered with Russell Investments for its "Invested with Russell" program, which donated $3,000 to Wilson's charitable foundation for every touchdown he scored.

Wilson co-hosts an annual charity golf event along with NASCAR driver Kasey Kahne at Suncadia Resort in Cle Elum, Washington to support various organizations including Boys & Girls Clubs of America and Seattle Children's Hospital. In August 2016, Wilson's Why Not You Foundation raised $1,060,005 for the Seattle Children's Hospital's Strong Against Cancer initiative.

In March 2020, Wilson and Ciara partnered with Food Lifeline to donate one million meals to those in need during the COVID-19 pandemic.

In May 2022, Wilson and Ciara received the Paul G. Allen Humanitarian Award for their philanthropic and humanitarian contributions to Seattle.

In July 2022, Wilson and Ciara pledged to donate $500,000 to nonprofit organizations in Colorado.

See also
 List of NCAA Division I FBS passing touchdowns leaders
 List of NCAA major college football yearly passing leaders
 List of Seattle Seahawks starting quarterbacks
 List of Super Bowl starting quarterbacks
 List of NFL quarterbacks who have posted a perfect passer rating
 List of National Football League annual passing touchdowns leaders

References

External links

Denver Broncos bio
NC State Wolfpack bio
Wisconsin Badgers bio

1988 births
Living people
African-American baseball players
African-American Christians
African-American players of American football
American football quarterbacks
American humanitarians
American people who self-identify as being of Native American descent
American philanthropists
American soccer chairmen and investors
Asheville Tourists players
Baseball players from Cincinnati
Baseball players from Richmond, Virginia
Baseball players from Seattle
Baseball second basemen
Denver Broncos players
Major League Soccer owners
National Conference Pro Bowl players
NC State Wolfpack baseball players
NC State Wolfpack football players
Players of American football from Cincinnati
Players of American football from Richmond, Virginia
Players of American football from Seattle
Seattle Seahawks players
Sportspeople from Bellevue, Washington
Tri-City Dust Devils players
Unconferenced Pro Bowl players
Wisconsin Badgers football players